Kim Jin-hyeok (born 15 May 1989 in Gyeongsangbuk-do) is an amateur South Korean Greco-Roman wrestler, who competes in the men's middleweight category. Kim represented South Korea at the 2012 Summer Olympics in London, where he competed in the men's 74 kg class. Unfortunately, he lost his qualifying round match to Georgia's Zurabi Datunashvili, who was able to score six points in two straight periods, leaving Kim without a single point.

He competed in the 87kg event at the 2022 World Wrestling Championships held in Belgrade, Serbia.

References

External links
Profile – International Wrestling Database
NBC Olympics Profile

1989 births
Living people
South Korean male sport wrestlers
Olympic wrestlers of South Korea
Wrestlers at the 2012 Summer Olympics
Sportspeople from North Gyeongsang Province
21st-century South Korean people